Ross is a hamlet on the coast of the Scottish Borders area of Scotland, south of Burnmouth, in the parish of Ayton, and close to the A1.

Ross is one of four small communities, the others being Lower Burnmouth, Partanhall, and Cowdrait.

Settlements nearby include Mordington, Lamberton Moor, Hilton Bay, Foulden, Ayton Castle and Eyemouth.

See also
List of places in the Scottish Borders
List of places in Scotland

External links
RCAHMS record for Ross Parish of Mordington
RCAHMS record for Ross Point, Burnmouth (Baron Stjernblad steamship)
RCAHMS record for Ross Point
Berwickshire Coastal Path (Part 6): Berwick to Burnmouth
Walk 226: St Abbs to Berwick-on-Tweed
Parish of Mordington: Ross

Villages in the Scottish Borders